These are the official results of the men's decathlon competition at the 1982 European Athletics Championships in Athens, Greece. The competition was held on 7 September and 8 September 1982. Points are based on the 1962 scoring tables.

Medalists

Participation
27 athletes from 13 countries participated in the event.

 (1)
 (2)
 (1)
 (3)
 (2)
 (1)
 (2)
 (2)
 (3)
 (2)
 (3)
 (2)
 (3)

See also
 Athletics at the 1980 Summer Olympics – Men's decathlon
 1982 Decathlon Year Ranking
 1983 World Championships in Athletics – Men's decathlon
 Athletics at the 1984 Summer Olympics – Men's decathlon

References

 Results
 details

Decathlon
Combined events at the European Athletics Championships